Uurad or Ferat son of Bargoit (died 842) was king of the Picts, perhaps from 839 to 842.

No two versions of the king-lists, known as the Pictish Chronicle, give exactly the same version of his name. Ferat, or Uurad in Pictish, is the most common reading, but Feradach may be intended.

Thomas Owen Clancy's interpretation of the Drosten Stone would make Ferat one of only two Pictish monarchs, the other being Caustantín mac Fergusa, whose name is read on a Pictish stone.

One version of the origin tale of St Andrews states that it was written by one Thana son of Dudabrach, at Meigle, in the reign of "Pherath son of Bergeth".

His sons may have included Bridei, Ciniod, and Drest, who contested for power in Pictland with kin groups led by Bruide son of Fokel, and Kenneth MacAlpin (Cináed mac Ailpín).

Notes

References

 Anderson, Alan Orr, Early Sources of Scottish History A.D 500–1286, volume 1. Reprinted with corrections. Paul Watkins, Stamford, 1990.

External links
 Pictish Chronicle

842 deaths
Pictish monarchs
9th-century Scottish monarchs
Year of birth unknown